The initiated Sikh is asked by the Panj Piare during the Amrit Sanchar ceremony to recite the following five banis (Gurmukhi: ਪੰਜ ਬਾਣੀਆਂ paja bāṇī'āṁ) as a commitment to the Sikh Gurus and Waheguru. The banis are also recited daily, starting in the early morning (Amrit Vela). Through time, the "five banis" has come to mean different things to different groups of Sikhs.

Five Banis of the Morning
 Japji Sahib
 Jaap Sahib
 Tav-Prasad Savaiye
 Chaupai Sahib
 Anand Sahib

As per the Sikh Code of Conduct, Sikhs are only required to recite Japji Sahib, Jaap Sahib, & the Ten Sawayyas in the morning. Many Sikhs, including those who follow the lifestyle of the Damdami Taksal & AKJ, believe that Chaupai Sahib & Anand Sahib are also required in the morning prayers. Sometimes this is referred to as the Five Banis. These prayers are recited between 2 - 6 AM. These morning prayers are required to be followed by the Ardas.

Five Banis of the Day
Five Banis can also refer to Japji Sahib, Jaap Sahib, & the Ten Sawayyas in the morning, along with Rehras Sahib and Kirtan Sohila in the evening, which are the five minimum prayers to be recited daily by any amritdhari Khalsa Sikh, as per the Sikh Code of Conduct.

See also
 Nitnem
 Gurbani
 Simran
 Amrit vela
 Meditation
 Guru Granth Sahib
 Dasam Granth Sahib

References

External links 
 All Nitnem Path (Nitnem Prayers) in Punjabi, Hindi, English

Sikh practices
Sikh terminology